Bernie Louis Warren (March 2, 1912, – May 11, 1994) was a Major League Baseball player. Warren served in the United States Navy during World War II from January 1943 to October 1945, missing playing time in the process.

He was born in Elk City, Oklahoma, and died in Oklahoma City.

External links

1912 births
1994 deaths
Philadelphia Phillies players
New York Giants (NL) players
Major League Baseball catchers
Baseball players from Oklahoma
Minor league baseball managers
York Dukes players
Oklahoma City Indians players
Lincoln Links players
Chattanooga Lookouts players
Norfolk Elks players
Beatrice Blues players
Longview Cannibals players
Kilgore Braves players
Gadsden Pilots players
Knoxville Smokies players
Baltimore Orioles (IL) players
Jersey City Giants players
Minneapolis Millers (baseball) players
Buffalo Bisons (minor league) players
Memphis Chickasaws players
Ardmore Cardinals players
Pauls Valley Raiders players
People from Elk City, Oklahoma